The USTA Waikoloa Challenger was one of the series of Challenger Events on the United States Tennis Association circuit. The tournament was located at the Kohala Tennis Garden in Hawaii, USA, which is listed as one of the "50 Greatest U.S. Tennis Resorts" by Tennis magazine. Past champions and players include Andy Roddick, James Blake, Michael Chang, Dmitry Tursunov, Robby Ginepri, Michael Russell, and Frank Dancevic.

The record holder with two singles titles is Paul Goldstein.

Past finals

Singles

Doubles

References

ATP Challenger Tour
Defunct tennis tournaments in the United States
ATP Challengers in Hawaii
Tennis tournaments in the United States
Hilton Worldwide
Recurring sporting events established in 2000
2000 establishments in Hawaii